Evgeny Korolev, who was the defending champion, chose to not compete this year.
Rajeev Ram won in the final match 7–6(2), 6–7(5), 7–6(2), against Dustin Brown.

Seeds

Draw

Finals

Top half

Bottom half

References
 Main Draw
 Qualifying Draw

Lambertz Open by STAWAG - Singles
Lambertz Open by STAWAG